China Northern Airlines was an airline headquartered on the grounds of Shenyang Taoxian International Airport, Shenyang, Liaoning, People's Republic of China. Established on June 16, 1990, it was one of the six backbone airlines directly under the Civil Aviation Administration of China.

Besides Shenyang, it also had three hubs at Changchun Longjia International Airport, Harbin Taiping International Airport and Sanya Phoenix International Airport.

It was one of six major airline corporations that were formed as a result of the breakup of CAAC Airlines. It initially operated a fleet of Airbus A300-600R, MD-80, MD-90-30 and, later, Airbus A321-200 aircraft. It operated predominantly domestic destinations and also to North Korea, South Korea and Japan.

History

China Northern Airlines was established in 1990 to act as a successor to Swan Airlines. By the end of 1999, the airline had reached a total cargo rotation volume of 4882 million ton/km. In 2001 the airlines had ordered ten Airbus A321 but only six were in the fleet. It later merged into China Southern Airlines in 2003.

Fleet
The fleet as of 1995.

Frequent flyer program
Sky Pearl Club was China Northern Airlines’ frequent flyer program until 2003 when it merged with China Southern Airlines.

Accidents
 On November 13, 1993, China Northern Airlines Flight 6901 from Beijing to Urumqi, a McDonnell-Douglas MD-82 (Reg. B-2141) airliner, crashed on approach to Urumqi airport, killing 12 of 102 on board. Pilot error was blamed for the crash.
 On April 17, 2002, China Northern Airlines Flight 6621 from Dalian to Shenyang, a McDonnell-Douglas MD-82 airliner, nine minutes after takeoff, a man attempted to hijack the domestic flight. In-flight security personnel and passengers managed to overpower the man immediately. At 17:58 local time, the flight landed safely at Shenyang.
 On May 7, 2002, China Northern Airlines Flight 6136 from Beijing to Dalian, a McDonnell-Douglas MD-82 (Reg. It was later determined that a passenger who wanted to commit suicide started a fire on board the aircraft.

References

External links

 China Northern Airlines (Archive)
 China Northern Airlines (Archive) 

 
Defunct airlines of China
Airlines established in 1990
Airlines disestablished in 2003
Chinese companies disestablished in 2003
China Southern Airlines
Chinese companies established in 1990